The 2018 British Superbike Championship season is the 31st British Superbike Championship season. Shane Byrne will start the season as the defending Champion, having secured his sixth  overall title in the British Superbike Championship.

Teams and riders

All entries used Pirelli tyres.

Race calendar and results

NOTE:  Following concerns at Silverstone Circuit as a result of the MotoGP round cancellation, the shorter National Circuit was used.

Championship standings

Riders' championship
Scoring system
Points are awarded to the top fifteen finishers. A rider has to finish the race to earn points.

References

External links

British Superbike Championship
Superbike Championship
British
British Superbike Championship